John Alexander "Andy" Messersmith (born August 6, 1945) is a former Major League Baseball right-handed pitcher. During a 12-year baseball career, he pitched for the California Angels (1968–72), Los Angeles Dodgers (1973–75 and 1979), Atlanta Braves (1976–77) and the New York Yankees (1978). As a member of the Dodgers, he appeared in the 1974 World Series.

Career
Messersmith was born in Toms River, New Jersey but at the age of 5 his family moved to Orange County, California. After graduating from Western High School in Anaheim, Messersmith received a baseball scholarship from the University of California, Berkeley. Following his junior year of college, the California Angels drafted Messersmith with the 12th overall pick in the June 1966 amateur draft.

He was the starting pitcher in the 1974 Major League Baseball All-Star Game and was one of the main factors in the Dodgers' return to the World Series for the first time since 1966, and finished second in balloting for the Cy Young Award, which was won by his Dodger teammate Mike Marshall.

Messersmith is most famous for his role in the historic  Seitz decision which led to the downfall of Major League Baseball's reserve clause and ushered in the current era of free agency. It began when Messersmith went to spring training in 1975 and began negotiating his 1975 contract. He asked for a no-trade clause which the Dodgers refused. According to author John Helyar, in The Lords of the Realm, Messersmith was also deeply offended by general manager Al Campanis "inject(ing) a personal issue" into the talks (it "cut so deeply with him", Helyar has written, that Messersmith since has never disclosed it), and the pitcher refused to deal with anyone lower than team president Peter O'Malley.

He also pitched 1975 without a contract, leading the National League in complete games and shutouts, finishing second in earned run average with 2.29, and winning a Gold Glove (his second) as the league's best-fielding pitcher. Messersmith and Dave McNally were the only two players in 1975 playing on the one year reserve clause in effect at the time. McNally's season ended early due to injuries and he returned home, intending to retire, but agreeing to players' union director Marvin Miller's request that he sign onto the Messersmith grievance in case Messersmith ended up signing a new deal with the Dodgers before the season ended.

"It was less of an economic issue at the time than a fight for the right to have control over your own destiny", Messersmith told The Sporting News, looking back on his decision a decade later. "It was a matter of being tired of going in to negotiate a contract and hearing the owners say, 'OK, here's what you're getting. Tough luck'."

Messersmith and McNally won their case before arbitrator Peter Seitz, who was fired by the owners the day afterward. McNally followed through on his intention to retire but Messersmith signed a three-year, $1 million deal with the Atlanta Braves. Among other things, then-Braves owner Ted Turner suggested the nickname "Channel" for Messersmith and jersey number 17, in order to promote the television station that aired Braves games. Major League Baseball quickly nixed the idea.

Messersmith struggled trying to live up to his new contract which was sold to the New York Yankees for $100,000 at the Winter Meetings on December 8, 1977, having gone 16–15 in two seasons with the Braves, the second marred by injuries. The Yankees released him after an injury plagued 1978 season and he signed with the Dodgers, who gave him the very thing their first refusal drove him toward testing and defeating the old reserve system: a no-trade clause. But the injuries and stress had taken too much toll; Messersmith pitched in only 11 games for the Dodgers in 1979, going 2–4 with a 4.90 ERA, and retired after the Dodgers released him. He served two stints as a baseball coach  at Cabrillo College, from 1986 to 1991 and from 2005 to 2007, when he retired at age 63.  Messersmith's earned run average of 2.861 is the sixth lowest among starting pitchers whose careers began after the advent of the live-ball era in 1920, behind only Clayton Kershaw (2.44), Hoyt Wilhelm (2.52), Whitey Ford (2.75), Sandy Koufax (2.76), and Jim Palmer (2.856).

Career statistics

See also
 List of Major League Baseball annual wins leaders

References

External links

Andy Messersmith at SABR (Baseball BioProject)
ESPN – retrospective

Bibliography
 John Helyar, The Lords of the Realm: The Real History of Baseball. (New York: Villard/Random House, 1994.)
 

American League All-Stars
National League All-Stars
National League wins champions
Atlanta Braves players
California Angels players
Los Angeles Dodgers players
New York Yankees players
Major League Baseball pitchers
Gold Glove Award winners
Baseball players from New Jersey
Major League Baseball labor relations
Sportspeople from Toms River, New Jersey
1945 births
Living people
Seattle Angels players
El Paso Sun Kings players
California Golden Bears baseball players
Alaska Goldpanners of Fairbanks players